September 13 - Eastern Orthodox liturgical calendar - September 15

All fixed commemorations below celebrated on September 27 by Orthodox Churches on the Old Calendar.

For September 14th, Orthodox Churches on the Old Calendar commemorate the Saints listed on September 1.

Feasts
 The Universal Exaltation of the Precious and Life-giving Cross.

Saints
 Martyr Papas of Lycaonia (305)  (see also: March 16)
 Martyr Theocles, by the sword.
 Child-martyr Valerianus, by the sword.
 Saint Placilla the Empress (Aelia Flaccilla), wife of St. Theodosius the Great (400)
 Saint Maria of Tarsus (607)
 Saint Pelagios of Lefkada, Bishop of Lefkada, who took part in the Sixth Ecumenical Council  (7th century)

Pre-Schism Western saints
 Saints Caerealis and Sallustia, martyred in Rome (251)
 Saints Crescentian, Victor, Rosula and Generalis, martyrs in North Africa who suffered at the same time and place as St Cyprian (c. 258)
 Saint Crescentius of Rome, child-martyr, martyred in Rome (c. 300)
 Saint Maternus II, Bishop of Cologne in Germany (c. 325)
 Saint Cormac, probably the first Bishop of Cashel in Ireland (908)

Post-Schism Orthodox saints
 Venerable New Martyr Macarius of Thessaloniki and Mount Athos, disciple of St. Niphon, Patriarch of Constantinople (1527)
 Saint Gerasimos the New, founder of the sacred monastery of the Holy Trinity in Sourvia, near Makrinitsa (1740)

Other commemorations
 Repose of St. John Chrysostom, Archbishop of Constantinople (407)
 Holy Fathers of the Sixth Ecumenical Council (680-681)  (see also: January 23)
 Lesna Icon of the Most Holy Theotokos (1683)
 Uncovering of the relics (2000) of Sts. Alexandra (1789), Martha (1829), and Helen (1832), of Diveyevo Monastery.
 The Appearance of the Sign of the Holy Cross over the church of St. John the Theologian at Mount Hymettus in suburban Athens, on the eve of the Feast of the Exaltation of the All-Honourable and Life-giving Cross (1925)
 Repose of Bishop Arsenius (Zhadanovsky) of Serpukhov (1937)
 Repose of Archpriest Sergius Siderov of Kiev (1937)
 Repose of Priest Michael Shik of Moscow (1937)

Icon gallery

Notes

References

Sources
 September 14/September 27. Orthodox Calendar (PRAVOSLAVIE.RU).
 September 27 / September 14. HOLY TRINITY RUSSIAN ORTHODOX CHURCH (A parish of the Patriarchate of Moscow).
 September 14. OCA - The Lives of the Saints.
 The Autonomous Orthodox Metropolia of Western Europe and the Americas (ROCOR). St. Hilarion Calendar of Saints for the year of our Lord 2004. St. Hilarion Press (Austin, TX). p. 69.
 The Fourteenth Day of the Month of September. Orthodoxy in China.
 September 14. Latin Saints of the Orthodox Patriarchate of Rome.
 The Roman Martyrology. Transl. by the Archbishop of Baltimore. Last Edition, According to the Copy Printed at Rome in 1914. Revised Edition, with the Imprimatur of His Eminence Cardinal Gibbons. Baltimore: John Murphy Company, 1916. pp. 282–283.
 Rev. Richard Stanton. A Menology of England and Wales, or, Brief Memorials of the Ancient British and English Saints Arranged According to the Calendar, Together with the Martyrs of the 16th and 17th Centuries. London: Burns & Oates, 1892. pp. 447–448.

 Greek Sources
 Great Synaxaristes:  14 ΣΕΠΤΕΜΒΡΙΟΥ. ΜΕΓΑΣ ΣΥΝΑΞΑΡΙΣΤΗΣ.
  Συναξαριστής. 14 Σεπτεμβρίου. ECCLESIA.GR. (H ΕΚΚΛΗΣΙΑ ΤΗΣ ΕΛΛΑΔΟΣ).
  14/09/. Ορθόδοξος Συναξαριστής.

 Russian Sources
  27 сентября (14 сентября). Православная Энциклопедия под редакцией Патриарха Московского и всея Руси Кирилла (электронная версия). (Orthodox Encyclopedia - Pravenc.ru).
  14 сентября по старому стилю  /  27 сентября по новому стилю. Русская Православная Церковь - Православный церковный календарь на  год.

September in the Eastern Orthodox calendar